This article lists the members of the Acolytes by its incarnations.

Known members

References

Acolytes